The first world record in the decathlon was recognized by the International Association of Athletics Federations in 1922.

As of 23 June 2012, 36 men's world records have been ratified by the IAAF in the event.
The current world record holder is French national Kevin Mayer with 9126 points.
Over the years, athletes have become bigger, stronger and faster, leading some to score more points.

The first world record in the women's decathlon was recognized by the IAAF in 2004. As of 21 June 2009, two world records have been ratified by the IAAF in the event.

Records

Men

Women

Notes

References

World record
World athletics record progressions